Kruševo is a village in northern Dalmatia, Croatia located south of Obrovac. The population is 1,112 (census 2011).

References

Populated places in Zadar County